The 2003–04 season of the Dutch Eredivisie began in August 2003 and ended in May 2004. The title was won by Ajax.

League standings

Results

Promotion/relegation play-offs

Top scorers

See also 
 2003–04 Eerste Divisie
 2003–04 KNVB Cup

References 

 Eredivisie official website - info on all seasons 
 RSSSF

Eredivisie seasons
Netherlands
1